Frane Bitunjac (born 4 September 1997 in Split, Croatia)  is a Croatian footballer who plays as a midfielder for Primorac Biograd.

Club career
Frane was born in Split but grew up in Kričak and he lived in Knin near Šibenik, playing for youth team of Dinara Knin. He moved to Šibenik and was a constant member of Croatian youth teams. On 31 January 2014 it was announced that Frane will join Fiorentina in summer of 2014 for an undisclosed fee. After joining HNK Šibenik and not playing enough, Frane signed for NK Zagora Unesic football club playing in 3rd Croatian league. Frane showed his huge talent playing as a central midfielder and become one of the best players on the team.

References

1997 births
Living people
Footballers from Split, Croatia
Association football forwards
Croatian footballers
Croatia youth international footballers
HNK Šibenik players
NK Zagora Unešić players
HNK Primorac Biograd na Moru players
First Football League (Croatia) players
Second Football League (Croatia) players